Trident Peak is a summit in the U.S. state of Nevada.

Trident Peak was so named on account of its trident-shaped profile.

References

Mountains of Humboldt County, Nevada